The Chief Justice of Guyana is the senior judge of the High Court of the Supreme Court of Guyana and is appointed by the President of Guyana. The High Court consists of the Chief Justice as President of the Court supported by several Puisne Judges.

There is a right of appeal from the Supreme Court to the Guyana Court of Appeal, which was established in 1966 and consists of the Chancellor as President of the Court assisted by the Chief Justice and several Justices of Appeal. Since 1966 the Chancellor has thus been the head of the Judiciary in Guyana.

Chancellors
1966–1968 Sir Kenneth Sievewright Stoby
1968–1975 Sir Edward Victor Luckhoo
1976–1980 Joseph Oscar Fitzclarence Haynes
1980–1984 Victor E. Crane
1984–1988 Keith S. Massiah
1988–1995 Kenneth Montague George
1995–1996 Aubrey F. R. Bishop
1996–?2001 Cecil C Kennard
2001–2005 Désirée Bernard
2005–2017 Carl Ashok Singh (acting)
2017–present Yonette Cummings-Edwards (acting)

Chief Justices
c.1826 Sergeant Rough (President of Court of Justice)
1821–1835 Charles Wray (President of Court of Justice)
1835–1836 John Walpole Willis (Vice-President of Court of Justice under Charles Wray)
1836–1852 Jeffery Hart Bent
1852–?1862 William Arrindell (died from fall, 1862)
1863–1868 John Beaumont
1868–1878 Sir William Snagg
1878–1895 David Patrick Chalmers 
1895–1897 Sir Edward Loughlin O'Malley
1897–1901 Sir William James Smith
1902–1912 Sir Henry Alleyne Bovell
1912–1914 Sir Thomas Crossley Rayner (died in office)
 Maurice Julian Berkeley (acting)
1914–1926 Sir Charles Major
1927–1934 Sir Anthony de Freitas
1934–1938 Sir Bernard Arthur Crean (afterwards Chief Justice of Cyprus, 1938)
1938–1942 Maurice Vincent Camacho
1942–1945 Sir John Verity
1947–1951 Sir Newnham Worley
?–1955 Sir (Edward) Peter Stubbs Bell (afterwards Chief Justice of Northern Rhodesia, 1955)
1955–1959 Frank William Holder
1958–?1960 Kenneth Sievewright Stoby
1960–1966 Sir Joseph Alexander Luckhoo
1966 Guyana became independent and Court of Appeal established.
1966–1980 Harold Bollers
1981–1988 Kenneth Montague George 
c.1990 Rudolph Harper
1995-1996 Cecil C Kennard
1996–2001 Désirée Bernard
2001–2015 Ian Chang (acting)
2015–2017 Yonette Cummings-Edwards (acting)
2017–present Roxane George-Wiltshire (acting)

References

Chief Justices of British Guiana
Law of Guyana
Chief justices